Graham McDonald Harris (born 29 August 1937) is a former Australian politician. He was a Liberal Party of Australia member of the Australian House of Representatives from 1980 to 1983, representing the electorate of Chisholm.

Harris was born in Melbourne and studied law at the University of Melbourne, before practising as a barrister from 1961 until his election to parliament. He was a member of the Royal Australian Naval Reserve from 1965 and was promoted to Lieutenant Commander in 1974. Harris was an active member of the Liberal Party for many years, serving on its state council from 1970 to 1981 and as chairman of his state and federal electorate committees.

In 1980, he was elected to the House of Representatives at the 1980 election upon the retirement of Tony Staley. He held the seat until his defeat in 1983 by Labor's Helen Mayer. Harris opposed the controversial Franklin Dam in Tasmania, which was highly unpopular in his electorate, and attributed anti-dam campaigning targeting the government by The Wilderness Society as a factor in his defeat. Harris recontested the seat against Mayer at the 1984 election, losing by only 200 votes in a closely-fought race in which Harris campaigned on opposition to the Hawke government's assets test for taxation.

Harris returned to legal practice after his defeat in 1983 and remained a practising barrister until 1994, after which he engaged in other business interests. He was awarded the Reserve Force Decoration in 1985, was promoted by the Navy Reserve to the rank of Commander in 1985 and served as Director Naval Intelligence (Reserves) in the RANR from 1989 to 1993. He was later state president (1992-1994) and national president (1994-2017) of the Navy League.

References

1937 births
Living people
Liberal Party of Australia members of the Parliament of Australia
Members of the Australian House of Representatives
Members of the Australian House of Representatives for Chisholm
Politicians from Melbourne
Melbourne Law School alumni
20th-century Australian politicians